Abstract algebra is the subject area of mathematics that studies algebraic structures, such as groups, rings, fields, modules, vector spaces, and algebras. The phrase abstract algebra was coined at the turn of the 20th century to distinguish this area from what was normally referred to as algebra, the study of the rules for manipulating formulae and algebraic expressions involving unknowns and real or complex numbers, often now called elementary algebra. The distinction is rarely made in more recent writings.

Basic language
Algebraic structures are defined primarily as sets with operations. 
Algebraic structure
Subobjects: subgroup, subring, subalgebra, submodule etc.
Binary operation
Closure of an operation
Associative property
Distributive property
Commutative property
Unary operator
Additive inverse, multiplicative inverse, inverse element
Identity element
Cancellation property
Finitary operation
Arity

Structure preserving maps called homomorphisms are vital in the study of algebraic objects.
Homomorphisms
Kernels and cokernels
Image and coimage
Epimorphisms and monomorphisms
Isomorphisms
Isomorphism theorems

There are several basic ways to combine algebraic objects of the same type to produce a third object of the same type. These constructions are used throughout algebra.
Direct sum
Direct limit
Direct product
Inverse limit
Quotient objects: quotient group, quotient ring, quotient module etc.
Tensor product

Advanced concepts:
Category theory
Category of groups
Category of abelian groups
Category of rings
Category of modules (over a fixed ring)
Morita equivalence, Morita duality
Category of vector spaces
Homological algebra
Filtration (algebra)
Exact sequence
Functor
Zorn's lemma

Semigroups and monoids

Semigroup
Subsemigroup
Free semigroup
Green's relations
Inverse semigroup (or inversion semigroup, cf. )
Krohn–Rhodes theory
Semigroup algebra
Transformation semigroup
Monoid
Aperiodic monoid
Free monoid
Monoid (category theory)
Monoid factorisation
Syntactic monoid

Group theory

Structure
Group (mathematics)
Lagrange's theorem (group theory)
Subgroup
Coset
Normal subgroup
Characteristic subgroup
Centralizer and normalizer subgroups
Derived group
Frattini subgroup
Fitting subgroup
Classification of finite simple groups
Sylow theorems
Local analysis

Constructions
Free group
Presentation of a group
Word problem for groups
Quotient group
Extension problem
Direct sum, direct product
Semidirect product
Wreath product

Types
Simple group
Finite group
Abelian group
Torsion subgroup
Free abelian group
Finitely generated abelian group
Rank of an abelian group
Cyclic group
Locally cyclic group
Solvable group
Composition series
Nilpotent group
Divisible group
Dedekind group, Hamiltonian group

Examples
Examples of groups
Trivial group
Additive group
Permutation group
Symmetric group
Alternating group
p-group
List of small groups
Klein four-group
Quaternion group
Dihedral group
Dicyclic group
Automorphism group
Point group
Circle group
Linear group
Orthogonal group

Applications
Group action
Conjugacy class
Inner automorphism
Conjugate closure
Stabilizer subgroup
Orbit (group theory)
Orbit-stabilizer theorem
Cayley's theorem
Burnside's lemma
Burnside's problem
Loop group
Fundamental group

Ring theory

General
Ring (mathematics)
Commutative algebra, Commutative ring
Ring theory, Noncommutative ring
Algebra over a field
Non-associative algebra
Relatives to rings: Semiring, Nearring, Rig (algebra)

Structure
Subring, Subalgebra
Center (algebra)
Ring ideal
Principal ideal
Ideal quotient
Maximal ideal, minimal ideal
Primitive ideal, prime ideal, semiprime ideal
Radical of an ideal
Jacobson radical
Socle of a ring
unit (ring theory), Idempotent, Nilpotent, Zero divisor
Characteristic (algebra)
Ring homomorphism, Algebra homomorphism
Ring epimorphism
Ring monomorphism
Ring isomorphism
Skolem–Noether theorem
Graded algebra
Morita equivalence
Brauer group

Constructions
Direct sum of rings, Product of rings
Quotient ring
Matrix ring
Endomorphism ring
Polynomial ring
Formal power series
Monoid ring, Group ring
Localization of a ring
Tensor algebra
Symmetric algebra, Exterior algebra, Clifford algebra
Free algebra
Completion (ring theory)

Types
Field (mathematics), Division ring, division algebra
Simple ring, Central simple algebra, Semisimple ring, Semisimple algebra
Primitive ring, Semiprimitive ring
Prime ring, Semiprime ring, Reduced ring
Integral domain, Domain (ring theory)
Field of fractions, Integral closure
Euclidean domain, Principal ideal domain, Unique factorization domain, Dedekind domain, Prüfer domain
Von Neumann regular ring
Quasi-Frobenius ring
Hereditary ring, Semihereditary ring
Local ring, Semi-local ring
Discrete valuation ring
Regular local ring
Cohen–Macaulay ring
Gorenstein ring
Artinian ring, Noetherian ring
Perfect ring, semiperfect ring
Baer ring, Rickart ring
Lie ring, Lie algebra
Ideal (Lie algebra)
Jordan algebra
Differential algebra
Banach algebra

Examples
Rational number, Real number, Complex number, Quaternions, Octonions
Hurwitz quaternion
Gaussian integer

Theorems and applications
Algebraic geometry
Hilbert's Nullstellensatz
Hilbert's basis theorem
Hopkins–Levitzki theorem
Krull's principal ideal theorem
Levitzky's theorem
Galois theory
Abel–Ruffini theorem
Artin-Wedderburn theorem
Jacobson density theorem
Wedderburn's little theorem
Lasker–Noether theorem

Field theory

Basic concepts
Field (mathematics)
Subfield (mathematics)
Multiplicative group
Primitive element (field theory)
Field extension
Algebraic extension
Splitting field
Algebraically closed field
Algebraic element
Algebraic closure
Separable extension
Separable polynomial
Normal extension
Galois extension
Abelian extension
Transcendence degree
Field norm
Field trace
Conjugate element (field theory)
Tensor product of fields

Types
Algebraic number field
Global field
Local field
Finite field
Symmetric function
Formally real field
Real closed field

Applications
Galois theory
Galois group
Inverse Galois problem
Kummer theory

Module theory

General
Module (mathematics)
Bimodule
Annihilator (ring theory)

Structure
Submodule
Pure submodule
Module homomorphism
Essential submodule
Superfluous submodule
Singular submodule
Socle of a module
Radical of a module

Constructions
Free module
Quotient module
Direct sum, Direct product of modules
Direct limit, Inverse limit
Localization of a module
Completion (ring theory)

Types
Simple module, Semisimple module
Indecomposable module
Artinian module, Noetherian module
Homological types:
Projective module
Projective cover
Swan's theorem
Quillen–Suslin theorem
Injective module
Injective hull
Flat module
Flat cover
Coherent module
Finitely-generated module
Finitely-presented module
Finitely related module
Algebraically compact module
Reflexive module

Concepts and theorems
Composition series
Length of a module
Structure theorem for finitely generated modules over a principal ideal domain
Homological dimension
Projective dimension
Injective dimension
Flat dimension
Global dimension
Weak global dimension
Cohomological dimension
Krull dimension
Regular sequence (algebra), depth (algebra)
Fitting lemma
Schur's lemma
Nakayama's lemma
Krull–Schmidt theorem
Steinitz exchange lemma
Jordan–Hölder theorem
Artin–Rees lemma
Schanuel's lemma
Morita equivalence
Progenerator

Representation theory

Representation theory
Algebra representation
Group representation
Lie algebra representation
Maschke's theorem
Schur's lemma
Equivariant map
Frobenius reciprocity
Induced representation
Restricted representation
Affine representation
Projective representation
Modular representation theory
Quiver (mathematics)
Representation theory of Hopf algebras

Non-associative systems

General
Associative property, Associator
Heap (mathematics)
Magma (algebra)
Loop (algebra), Quasigroup
Nonassociative ring, Non-associative algebra
Universal enveloping algebra
Lie algebra (see also list of Lie group topics and list of representation theory topics)
Jordan algebra
Alternative algebra
Power associativity
Flexible algebra

Examples
Cayley–Dickson construction
Octonions
Sedenions
Hyperbolic quaternions
Virasoro algebra

Generalities

Algebraic structure
Universal algebra
Variety (universal algebra)
Congruence relation
Free object
Generating set (universal algebra)
Clone (algebra)
Kernel of a function
Kernel (algebra)
Isomorphism class
Isomorphism theorem
Fundamental theorem on homomorphisms
Universal property
Filtration (mathematics)
Category theory
Monoidal category
Groupoid
Group object
Coalgebra
Bialgebra
Hopf algebra
Magma object
Torsion (algebra)

Computer algebra

Symbolic mathematics
Finite field arithmetic
Gröbner basis
Buchberger's algorithm

See also
List of commutative algebra topics
List of homological algebra topics
List of linear algebra topics
List of algebraic structures
Glossary of field theory
Glossary of group theory
Glossary of ring theory
Glossary of tensor theory

Mathematics-related lists
 
Outlines of mathematics and logic
Wikipedia outlines